The Neshanic Station Lenticular Truss Bridge is a road bridge built over the South Branch Raritan River at Neshanic Station, New Jersey. It was constructed by the Berlin Iron Bridge Co. in 1896. and listed on the National Register of Historic Places as a contributing structure to the Neshanic Station Historic District on February 8, 2016.

Gallery

See also
List of bridges documented by the Historic American Engineering Record in New Jersey
List of bridges on the National Register of Historic Places in New Jersey
List of crossings of the Raritan River

References

External links

Bridges over the Raritan River
Historic American Engineering Record in New Jersey
Bridges in Somerset County, New Jersey
Branchburg, New Jersey
Hillsborough Township, New Jersey
Lenticular truss bridges in the United States
Historic district contributing properties in New Jersey
National Register of Historic Places in Somerset County, New Jersey
Road bridges on the National Register of Historic Places in New Jersey